is a multi-purpose indoor arena located in Chūō-ku, Saitama, Saitama Prefecture, Japan. It opened preliminarily on May 5, 2000, and then was officially opened on September 1 of the same year. Its maximum capacity is 36,500, making it the second-largest indoor arena in the world. The main arena capacity is between 19,000 and 22,500.

The arena was designed by Dan Meis, who at the time was working for architecture firm Ellerbe Becket, together with Nikken Sekkei. Meis's design was selected as a result of an international design competition. The arena features a gigantic movable section of seating which can reduce capacity for smaller events and create a more intimate setting.

It is a favorite venue for puroresu (Japanese professional wrestling) and mixed martial arts (MMA). It has also hosted other sports events such as boxing, basketball, volleyball, tennis, ice hockey, and gymnastics. It is the only Japanese arena equipped especially for American football.

It formerly housed the John Lennon Museum, which displayed John Lennon memorabilia and closed in 2010.

Events

Mixed martial arts and professional wrestling 

The Saitama Super Arena hosted a special WWE Smackdown event that took place on February 5, 2005 and was later broadcast on February 10, 2005. The event is famously remembered for the "Kimono Match" that took place between Torrie Wilson and Hiroko Suzuki (a Japanese native who would later be elected to the Funabashi city council as part of a political career). Hiroko was defeated after losing her kimono, being stripped down to her bra and panties at the hands of Torrie.

The Saitama Super Arena has hosted a major martial arts event on New Year's Eve since 2001. It was sanctioned by Pride Fighting Championships from 2003 to 2006. The 2007 edition was hosted by Yarennoka, an MMA promotion organized by the former staff members of Pride Fighting Championship. Dynamite!! 2008 featured Dream and K-1 fights. Dynamite!! 2009 featured fights by Dream, Sengoku and K-1. Dynamite!! 2010 featured Dream and K-1 fights. Fight For Japan: Genki Desu Ka Omisoka 2011 featured fights by Dream, K-1 and IGF. The 2012 edition featured Dream and Glory fights. Since 2015 the event is the final round of the Rizin Fighting Federation.

On November 29, 2009, the arena hosted one of the biggest fights in Japan's history, with WBC Flyweight Champion Daisuke Naito defending his title against Koki Kameda.

The arena hosted the Japanese return of the Ultimate Fighting Championship on February 26, 2012 for UFC 144. Followed by UFC on Fuel TV: Silva vs. Stann on March 3, 2013 and UFC Fight Night: Hunt vs. Nelson on September 20, 2014 as well as UFC Fight Night: Barnett vs. Nelson on September 26, 2015.

On November 7, 2019, Japanese bantamweight boxer Naoya Inoue defeated Nonito Donaire at the arena to claim the 2018–19 World Boxing Super Series.

On December 29, 2019, the arena hosted Bellator 237.

Other sports 
It is one of two home arenas of the Saitama Broncos basketball team.

In 2000, the arena hosted two NHL ice hockey games between the Nashville Predators and the Pittsburgh Penguins.

In 2003, NBA basketball teams Seattle SuperSonics and the Los Angeles Clippers, played two regular season games. In 2006, the arena hosted the knockout stage of the Basketball World Championship 2006. In 2019, the Houston Rockets and Toronto Raptors played two preseason games at the arena. In 2022, the arena again hosted two NBA preseason games, this time between the Golden State Warriors and Washington Wizards.

The 2014 and 2019 World Figure Skating Championships were held at the venue.

On New Year's Eve 2018, the arena hosted the exhibition boxing match between former five-division boxing world champion Floyd Mayweather Jr. and kickboxer Tenshin Nasukawa.

The arena hosted basketball competitions at 2020 Summer Olympics hosted by Tokyo.

Music 
Many music events have been held at the venue, including Music Station, Hey! Hey! Hey! Music Champ, Animelo Summer Live, WIRE, and 'Dream Power' concerts organized by Yoko Ono. Various notable Japanese music acts have performed at the arena, including Ado, AKB48, Namie Amuro, B'z, Babymetal, Berryz Kobo, Bump of Chicken, Minori Chihara, fripSide, Masaharu Fukuyama, Gackt, The Gazette, Gen Hoshino, Glay, Ayumi Hamasaki, Tomoyasu Hotei, Janne Da Arc, Kamen Joshi, Mai Kuraki, L'Arc-en-Ciel, Luna Sea, Man with a Mission, Nana Mizuki, Momoiro Clover Z, Morning Musume, Mr. Children, Nightmare, Kana Nishino, Nogizaka46, One Ok Rock, Pierrot, Radwimps, Maaya Sakamoto, Scandal, Ringo Sheena, Siam Shade, Sid, Sound Horizon, Spyair, Hikaru Utada, Vamps Aimer.

Some anime projects like Uta no Prince-sama, Love Live!, K-On!, The Idolmaster, and Touken Ranbu have featured in live performances at the arena.

Many international artists have performed at the venue, including The Black Eyed Peas, Mariah Carey, Madonna, Janet Jackson, Whitney Houston, Mariah Carey, Guns N' Roses, Beyoncé, Linkin Park, Ariana Grande, Coldplay, Lady Gaga, Avril Lavigne, Backstreet Boys, Muse, DragonForce, Metallica, Radiohead, AC/DC, Jeff Mills, Taylor Swift, U2, Iron Maiden, One Direction, Katy Perry, and K-pop acts BoA, TVXQ, Super Junior, BTS, SS501, Girls' Generation, Kara, Apink, Big Bang, 2PM, F.T. Island, 2NE1, Shinee, CNBLUE, Seventeen, Kim Jae-joong, Exo, Twice, NCT 127, Iz*One and Treasure. Queen + Paul Rodgers performed there, with the concerts being recorded in the concert DVD Super Live in Japan. Green Day taped the show for their new live album titled Awesome as Fuck. David Coverdale's band Whitesnake, while performing at the Loud Park Festival, recorded their performance for their live album Made in Japan.

Gallery

See also 
 Paris La Défense Arena, a venue near Paris similar in concept to the Super Arena
 List of indoor arenas in Japan

References

External links 

 Saitama Super Arena (in English by Saitama Arena Co., Ltd.)
 Saitama Super Arena | Cultural/Sports | Projects | Nikken Sekkei Ltd.
 Saitama Super Arena — Meis architects

2000 establishments in Japan
Indoor arenas in Japan
Indoor ice hockey venues in Japan
Basketball venues in Japan
College football venues
Music venues in Japan
Music venues completed in 2000
Sports venues completed in 2000
Boxing venues in Japan
Saitama Broncos
Sports venues in Saitama (city)
Venues of the 2020 Summer Olympics
Olympic basketball venues